A velocipede is a human-powered, wheeled land vehicle. The term may also refer to:

 Velocipede, original name of the Benz Velo, the first large-scale production car
 Velocipede (horse) (1825–1850), a British Thoroughbred racehorse and sire
 , a United States Navy patrol vessel in commission from 1917 to 1919
 Velocipede, a ship - see List of shipwrecks in January 1825
 Velocipede, a brig - see List of shipwrecks in May 1851 
 Velocipede, a ship that was shipwrecked in the North Sea - see List of shipwrecks in August 1874
 LNWR 187 Velocipede - see Locomotives of the London and North Western Railway

See also
 Le Vélocipède Illustré, a French newspaper published twice a month from 1869 to 1872